Zeradina parva is a species of sea snail, a marine gastropod mollusk in the family Vanikoridae.

Original description
   Poppe G.T., Tagaro S.P. & Stahlschmidt P. (2015). New shelled molluscan species from the central Philippines I. Visaya. 4(3): 15-59.
page(s): 28, pl. 10 figs 1-2.

References

External links
 Worms Link

Vanikoridae
Gastropods described in 2015